St. John the Baptist Catholic Church is a historic Roman Catholic church in Marion Township, Mercer County, Ohio, United States.  Located in the unincorporated community of Maria Stein, it is the home of an active congregation and has been recognized as a historic site because of its well-preserved late nineteenth-century Romanesque Revival architecture.

Parish history

The community of St. Johns was established in 1833. When the Cincinnati, Hamilton, and Dayton Railway expanded through Mercer County some years later, its surveyors chose a path through the small community of Maria Stein, to the west of St. Johns.  As these two communities were separated by only , business interests migrated to the vicinity of the railroad, and the two communities eventually merged under the name of Maria Stein.

Large numbers of Catholics from northern Europe settled in southern Mercer County and surrounding regions in the early nineteenth century because of the activities of the Society of the Precious Blood in the region. From this convent was derived the name of the community.

St. John the Baptist Parish was founded in St. Johns in 1837 by priests of the Society from the village of Minster to the east; at that time, it was dedicated to John the Baptist.  A small log church was erected to house the congregation, but the number of parishioners soon grew to the point that it was inadequate to house the congregation.  Accordingly, a brick church was built to replace the log structure. As the membership continued to grow, multiple additions were built onto the original structure. By the 1880s, the parish had decided to replace the old brick church entirely with a yet larger building. The new and current church was built between 1888-1894 using 135,000 bricks and at a total cost of $43,354.19 paid from a building fund and special collections (Approx. $1.5 Million in 2022 dollars).

Today, St. John's remains an active parish of the Archdiocese of Cincinnati.  It is part of the Marion Catholic Community cluster, along with Precious Blood parish in Chickasaw, Nativity of the Blessed Virgin parish in Cassella, St. Rose parish in St. Rose, and St. Sebastian parish in Sebastian.  The entire cluster is a part of the St. Marys Deanery.

Architecture

The current St. John's Church was completed in 1888 at a cost of $40,145.  Its architecture, which has been ranked among the leading churches of Mercer County, features a massive tower that was designed to house four tower clocks.  Large amounts of sandstone are used to trim the corners of the brick church, which can be entered through three doors at the base of the tower.  The church is built on a stone foundation and is topped with a gabled roof of asphalt.  Many rounded lancet windows of stained glass illuminate the interior; among the most prominent of its windows are those of the sacristy, which feature deep blue stained glass.  The church's heavily decorated interior includes elaborate altars and a reredos built in the Romanesque Revival style.

A renovation project in the 1960s removed many of the exterior decorative features, including tops of the side pilasters, trim on the rounded windows and tower, and border around the upper exterior nave.  The church interior has not been renovated as extensively.

Architectural historians have divided the Precious Blood-related churches of western Ohio into four generations.  St. John's is typical of the churches of the third generation, which are generally Gothic Revival structures with a single central tower.  It was designed by German-born architect, Adolphus Druiding (1838-1899) of Chicago and built by Anton DeCurtins (1829-1895) of nearby, Carthagena.

Related buildings
Two different Catholic schools have been operated by the parish.  Its high school building (now demolished), erected in 1930, was built on the opposite side of State Route 119 from the church; after some years as a high school, it was converted into an elementary school.  An earlier school, established and closed on unknown dates, was formerly operated in association with St. John's Church.  In 1907, this school's 200 students were taught by the Sisters of the Precious Blood.

Located immediately to the east of the church is a rectory, built in 1906.  Designed by the DeCurtins Brothers in a combination of architectural styles, its walls are built of brick, laid in a stretcher bond; the square structure rests on a stone foundation and is covered by a slate roof that is pierced by multiple dormer windows.  In addition to its buildings, the parish maintains a cemetery adjacent to the church.

Preservation

In 1977, St. John's Church and its associated rectory were recorded by the Ohio Historic Inventory, a historic preservation program of the Ohio State Historic Preservation Office. This architectural survey ranked both buildings in good condition with no threats to their historic integrity. Two years later, the church and rectory were listed together on the National Register of Historic Places because of their architectural significance. More than thirty other buildings in western Ohio related to the Society of the Precious Blood were listed on the National Register at the same time as part of a multiple property submission. These historic buildings, both churches and other church-related structures, are the namesake of the region of rural western Ohio known as the "Land of the Cross-Tipped Churches."

References

Further reading
Miller, James E.  "Historic Maria Stein Parish Named After Swiss Convent."  The Daily Standard, November 1950.
"History of St. John Parish in Maria Stein".  Nuntius Aulae XI-XII (1928-1928).

External links

Church profile

Roman Catholic churches completed in 1889
19th-century Roman Catholic church buildings in the United States
Churches in the Land of the Cross-Tipped Churches
Gothic Revival church buildings in Ohio
Churches in Mercer County, Ohio
National Register of Historic Places in Mercer County, Ohio
Religious organizations established in 1837
Churches in the Roman Catholic Archdiocese of Cincinnati
1837 establishments in Ohio
Maria Stein, Ohio